Griselda Khng (born July 31, 1991) is a Singaporean sailor. She and Sara Tan placed 15th in the 49erFX event at the 2016 Summer Olympics.

References

External links
 

1991 births
Living people
Singaporean female sailors (sport)
Olympic sailors of Singapore
Sailors at the 2016 Summer Olympics – 49er FX
Sailors at the 2006 Asian Games
Southeast Asian Games gold medalists for Singapore
Southeast Asian Games medalists in sailing
Competitors at the 2005 Southeast Asian Games
Asian Games competitors for Singapore
21st-century Singaporean women